Twelve Liberal Democrat Members of Parliament (MPs) were elected to the House of Commons of the United Kingdom at the 2017 general election. Stephen Lloyd resigned the whip in December 2018 to vote for May's withdrawal agreement, while former Labour and Change UK MP Chuka Umunna joined the party in June 2019 after quitting Change UK. Jane Dodds was elected on 1 August 2019 in the Brecon and Radnorshire by-election. Former Conservative and Change UK MP Sarah Wollaston joined the party on 14 August 2019. Phillip Lee crossed the floor from the Conservative Party on 3 September 2019 due to disagreements over the Conservatives' handling of Brexit, followed by former Labour and Change UK independent Luciana Berger two days later. Two days after Berger's defection Angela Smith, another former Labour and Change UK independent, also joined the Lib Dems. On 14 September, at the start of the Liberal Democrats conference in Bournemouth, Sam Gyimah defected to the party from the Conservatives. On 7 October, former Change UK leader (and, before that, Conservative MP) Heidi Allen joined the Liberal Democrats, becoming their 19th MP. Stephen Lloyd was elected as a Liberal Democrat but resigned the Liberal Democrat whip in order to support the proposed European Union withdrawal agreement; he sat as an independent from 6 December 2018, though remained a party member, until he asked to re-take the whip on 29 October 2019. On 31 October 2019 expelled Conservative MP Antoinette Sandbach became the 21st Liberal Democrat MP.

MPs

See also
 List of MPs elected in the 2017 United Kingdom general election
 List of MPs for constituencies in England (2017–2019)
 List of MPs for constituencies in Northern Ireland (2017–2019)
 List of MPs for constituencies in Scotland (2017–2019)
 List of MPs for constituencies in Wales (2017–2019)
 Members of the House of Lords
 :Category:UK MPs 2017–2019

Notes

References

Sources

</noinclude>

2017-
Liberal Democrat